Karim Rekik (born 2 December 1994) is a Dutch professional footballer who plays as a defender for La Liga club Sevilla.

Early life
Rekik was born in The Hague. His father was born in Tunisia and his mother is a Dutch primary school teaching assistant. He has a younger brother, Omar, who is also a professional footballer playing as a centre-back for Arsenal.

Rekik started his football when he joined Scheveningen in 1999 before joining Feyenoord, where he went on to stay for nine years. But in March 2011, Manchester City made an approach for Rekik, as Feyernood were determined to keep a hold off him. The approach was to be controversial, as the club took the case matter to the Dutch FA, as a result of the club losing their youngsters to Premier League clubs. The club was also considering legal action against Rekik's agent Søren Lerby, though he insisted he maintain following FIFA's rules. The case was dismissed.

Club career

Manchester City
Rekik signed for Manchester City from Feyenoord in the summer of 2011, and made his debut appearance for the first team in the Dublin Super Cup in pre-season.

He made his official first team debut for Manchester City on 21 September 2011 against Birmingham City in the third round of the League Cup, coming on as a substitute for Wayne Bridge in the last 12 minutes of the game. His debut against Birmingham City saw him become the youngest overseas player to appear in a senior game for City, just 16 years and 294 days old. He also made a 73rd-minute substitute appearance in the fourth round of the competition against Wolverhampton Wanderers at Molineux, in place of Luca Scapuzzi.

Rekik returned to Manchester City at the end of the 2011–12 season. On 5 December 2012, it was announced that Rekik signed a long term contract with the club. He would go on to start in his Premier League debut, a 1–0 win at home to Reading on 22 December 2012, and was substituted for James Milner in the 84th minute. Reading claimed that they deserved a penalty for Rekik's challenge on Jay Tabb, which was not given by referee Mike Dean.

On 10 August 2014, Rekik was an unused substitute as City lost the Community Shield 3–0 to Arsenal at Wembley Stadium.

Loan spells in England
On 22 March 2012, it was confirmed that Michael Appleton was to take Scapuzzi and Rekik on a month's loan at Portsmouth in the Football League Championship. He made his debut for Portsmouth on 27 March, in a 2–0 home win against Hull City. This was also Rekik's first senior league appearance in club football. Unlike Scapuzzi, Rekik became a regular starter as Portsmouth struggled to fight relegation. He was an ever-present figure in the Portsmouth defence as the league came to an end. Nevertheless, Portsmouth were relegated at the end of the season.

On 15 February 2013, it was confirmed that Rekik would join Blackburn Rovers in the Championship until the end of the season. The move reunited him with his former Portsmouth manager Appleton. Rekik made his Blackburn Rovers debut, playing as a left-midfield, in a 2–0 loss against Hull City on 19 February 2013. Rekik went on to make five appearances for the club.

PSV Eindhoven (loan)
On 8 July 2013, it was confirmed that Rekik would join PSV Eindhoven on loan for the 2013–14 season, wearing number 3.

Rekik made his PSV Eindhoven debut, in the first leg of third round of Champions League, in a 2–0 win over Zulte Waregem on 30 July 2013. Three days later, Rekik made his league debut, in the opening game of the season, in a 3–2 win over ADO Den Haag. Rekik played the remaining three matches in the Champions League play-off, as PSV were knocked out by Milan. However, Rekik suffered an ankle injury, while in international duty. As a result, Rekik would be out for four weeks, though he would need to undergo surgery. The surgery was successful, resulting him out for another four weeks. After two months on the sidelines, Rekik made his return from the first team on 2 November 2013, in a 1–1 draw against PEC Zwolle. He then scored his first Eredivisie goal for PSV on 7 December in a 2–6 home defeat to Vitesse. Rekik went on to captain two games in absence of Georginio Wijnaldum against Utrecht and ADO Den Haag. Later in the 2013–14 season, Rekik
became a regular starter at PSV, as he made twenty-five appearances for the club.

Because of his good performance at PSV, Rekik was keen to re-join PSV for the second time next season, though he could return to Manchester City for next season. However, Rekik said he would not return to Manchester City next season unless he was given first team chances.

As his loan spell with PSV came to an end, Rekik was linked with a move to Marseille. Instead on 14 August 2014, it announced that Rekik returned to PSV until the end of the season. Rekik's first game after signing for the club on a loan for the second time came, in a 6–1 win over NAC Breda on 16 August 2014. Rekik then scored his second goal of his PSV career on 9 November 2014, in a 2–1 win over Heracles. Since making his second debut for PSV, Rekik continued to be in the first team in straight matches until he suffered a hamstring injury and was substituted during a match against AZ Alkmaar on 13 February 2015. After making his return to training, Rekik made his return to the first team on 22 March 2015, in a 2–1 loss against Feyernood. Despite this, Rekik later helped PSV win their first league since 2008. Rekik later spoke out about the club's winning the league. Like his first season at PSV, Rekik established himself in the first team with twenty-nine appearances and formed a strong central-defense partnership with Jeffrey Bruma.

Following the 2014–15 season came to an end, PSV was keen to sign Rekik for the third time. However, PSV decided not to sign him after Rekik made it clear that he wanted to play in a bigger league than the Eredivisie.

Marseille
On 30 June 2015, Rekik joined Marseille for an undisclosed fee after making just two appearances for Manchester City in four years. The move was later confirmed on 2 July 2015 and the player was unveiled, along with Lucas Ocampos. Rekik scored his first goal for Marseille in a 1–1 Ligue 1 draw with rivals Lyon on 20 September.

Hertha BSC
On 16 June 2017, he signed for Hertha BSC for a reported fee of €2.5 million as a long term replacement for the departing John Anthony Brooks to VfL Wolfsburg.

Sevilla
On 5 October 2020, Rekik signed for Spanish club Sevilla FC until 2025.

International career
Rekik was eligible to play for Netherlands, through his birthplace, and Tunisia, through his father.

Rekik was called up by Netherlands U17 in September 2010 and made his Netherlands U17 debut, in a 0–0 draw against Italy U17. Rekik was then called up into the squad by Netherlands U17 for the UEFA European Under-17 Championship and scored the opening game of the season, in a 2–0 win over Germany U17. Rekik went on to help the club reach the final, where Netherlands U17 beat Germany U17 5–2.

Rekik was then called up by Netherlands U19 in October 2011 and made his Netherlands U19 debut, in a 3–0 win over Moldova U19. Rekik then captained his first Netherlands U19 game, in a 2–0 win over Norway U19. Rekik went on to captain five times in his eleven appearances.

In August 2013, Rekik was first called up Netherlands for the two matches in the World Cup Qualifying, but was never used.

Rekik made his debut for the Netherlands national team in a 2–0 friendly defeat to France at the Stade de France 6 March 2014. In May 2014, he was named in manager Louis van Gaal's provisional 30-man squad for the 2014 FIFA World Cup. However, on 31 May 2014, van Gaal announced his final squad, which saw Rekik left out of the 23 man squad.

Career statistics

Club

Notes

International

Honours

Club
PSV
Eredivisie: 2014–15

Marseille
Coupe de France runner-up: 2015–16

International
Netherlands U17
UEFA European Under-17 Championship: 2011

References

External links

Profile at the Sevilla FC website
Voetbal International profile 
Holland U16 stats at OnsOranje
Holland U17 stats at OnsOranje
Holland U19 stats at OnsOranje

1994 births
Living people
Dutch footballers
Dutch people of Tunisian descent
Association football central defenders
SVV Scheveningen players
Feyenoord players
Manchester City F.C. players
Portsmouth F.C. players
Blackburn Rovers F.C. players
PSV Eindhoven players
Olympique de Marseille players
Hertha BSC players
Sevilla FC players
English Football League players
Premier League players
Eredivisie players
Ligue 1 players
Championnat National 2 players
Bundesliga players
La Liga players
Footballers from The Hague
Netherlands youth international footballers
Netherlands under-21 international footballers
Netherlands international footballers
Dutch expatriate footballers
Dutch expatriate sportspeople in England
Dutch expatriate sportspeople in France
Dutch expatriate sportspeople in Germany
Dutch expatriate sportspeople in Spain
Expatriate footballers in England
Expatriate footballers in France
Expatriate footballers in Germany
Expatriate footballers in Spain
Dutch sportspeople of African descent
Sportspeople of Tunisian descent